Hans Uno Jonas Åkerlund (born 10 November 1965) is a Swedish film director, screenwriter, music video director, and drummer. His video for Madonna's song "Ray of Light" won a Grammy Award for Best Music Video, Short Form, and a record of five awards at 1998 MTV Video Music Awards, including the Video of the Year.

In 2008 he won another Grammy Award, this time around for "Best Long Form Music Video" for another work with Madonna – directing "The Confessions Tour" DVD. In 2014 he won this Grammy Award again (that meanwhile changed the name to "Best Music Film"), this time for "Live Kisses", a Paul McCartney concert film. Jonas Åkerlund, David Mallet and Bob Smeaton are the only directors to have won this award twice sharing the record for most wins in this category (check here all winners and nominees of Grammy Award for Best Music Film).

Career
Åkerlund was briefly a member of the Swedish black metal band Bathory from 1983 to 1984, before their career took off. He also directed Candlemass' first video "Bewitched". He first found fame as the main video director for Roxette. In 1997, he directed the acclaimed video for The Prodigy's "Smack My Bitch Up", which sparked controversy due to its depiction of drug use, violence, and nudity. In 1998, he worked with Madonna for the song "Ray of Light", and has since worked with acts such as Metallica, Christina Aguilera, U2, Blink-182, P!nk, Rammstein, Britney Spears, and Lady Gaga. He has directed the music video for the Smashing Pumpkins' "Try, Try, Try", from which a short film entitled Try was spawned. He was also the designer and photographer for the Roxette album Room Service in 2001. In 2002, his first full-length film, Spun, debuted.

Åkerlund directed commercials for Swedish clothing retailer MQ and the re-imagining of the Devo song "Watch Us Work It" used in Dell Computers commercials. He is a long-time collaborator of Madonna, having worked on such music videos as "Music", "American Life" (which was pulled due to its graphic content and the Iraq War), and "Jump". He also directed a documentary film I'm Going to Tell You a Secret about Madonna and her concert special The Confessions Tour: Live from London. 

Some of his other work includes the controversial pornographic music video for Rammstein's "Pussy", the video for the song "Telephone" by Lady Gaga and Beyoncé, "Moves like Jagger" by Maroon 5 and Christina Aguilera, and Duran Duran's single "Girl Panic!".

Åkerlund's second movie, Small Apartments (2012), went direct to DVD. Per Gessle, of Roxette, was credited for the music and soundtrack.

Videography

1988
"Bewitched" for Candlemass 
1989
"What's the Noise?" for Walk on Water
1992
"Shame, Shame, Shame" for Izabella Scorupco
"Så länge det lyser mittemot" for Marie Fredriksson (Female half of Roxette)
"Mellan sommar och höst" for Marie Fredriksson
1993
"Fingertips '93" for Roxette
1994
"Run to You" for Roxette
1995
"A la ronde" for Sinclair
"Vulnerable" for Roxette
"Pay for Me" for Whale
1996
"Rainbow" for Meja
"June Afternoon" for Roxette
"She Doesn't Live Here Anymore" for Roxette
"Un Dia Sin Ti" for Roxette (Spanish version of "Spending My Time")
1997 
"Do You Wanna Be My Baby?" for Per Gessle (Male half of Roxette)
"James Bond Theme" for Moby
"Kix" for Per Gessle
"I Want You To Know" for Per Gessle
"Smack My Bitch Up" for The Prodigy
1998
"Ray of Light" for Madonna
(Won the 1999 Grammy Award for Best Short Form Music Video)
"My Favourite Game" for The Cardigans
"Turn the Page" for Metallica
1999
"Whiskey in the Jar" for Metallica
"Wish I Could Fly" for Roxette
"Canned Heat" for Jamiroquai
"Anyone" for Roxette
"Corruption" for Iggy Pop
2000
"The Everlasting Gaze" for The Smashing Pumpkins
"Music" for Madonna
"Porcelain" (version 1) for Moby
"Try, Try, Try" for The Smashing Pumpkins
"Beautiful Day" (version 1: airport) for U2
"Black Jesus" for Everlast
"Still" (version 2: white hair) for Macy Gray
2001
"Gets Me Through" for Ozzy Osbourne
"Walk On" for U2
"The Centre of the Heart" for Roxette
"Circus" for Stina Nordenstam

2002
"A Thing About You" for Roxette
"Lonely Road" for Paul McCartney
"Fuel for Hatred" for Satyricon
"Me Julie" for Ali G and Shaggy
"If I Could Fall in Love" for Lenny Kravitz
"Beautiful" for Christina Aguilera
2003

"Opportunity Nox" for Roxette (co-directed with Kristoffer Diös)
"American Life" for Madonna
"Good Boys" for Blondie
"Aim 4" for Flint
"True Nature" for Jane's Addiction
"Come Undone" for Robbie Williams
"Sexed Up" for Robbie Williams
"Carnival Girl" for Texas
2004
"I Miss You" for blink-182
"Tits on the Radio" for Scissor Sisters (internet video only)
2005
"Rain Fall Down" for The Rolling Stones
2006
"Jump" for Madonna
"One Wish" for Roxette
"Mann gegen Mann" for Rammstein
"Country Girl" for Primal Scream
2007
"Wake Up Call" for Maroon 5
"Good God" for Anouk
"Same Mistake" for James Blunt
"Watch Us Work It" for Devo
2008
"No. 5" for Hollywood Undead
"Undead" for Hollywood Undead
"Sober" for Pink
2009
"Paparazzi" for Lady Gaga
"When Love Takes Over" for David Guetta feat. Kelly Rowland
"We Are Golden" for Mika
"Celebration" for Madonna
"Pussy" for Rammstein
"Fresh Out the Oven" for Jennifer Lopez and Pitbull
"Ich tu dir weh" for Rammstein
(Won the 2011 Echo for best video national)

2010
"Telephone" for Lady Gaga feat. Beyoncé
"Hot-n-Fun" for N.E.R.D feat. Nelly Furtado
"Let Me Hear You Scream" for Ozzy Osbourne
"Who's That Chick?" for David Guetta feat. Rihanna (Day Version)
"Who's That Chick?" for David Guetta feat. Rihanna (Night Version)
"One (Your Name)" for Swedish House Mafia feat. Pharrell
2011
"Hold It Against Me" for Britney Spears
"Hear Me Now" for Hollywood Undead
"Moves like Jagger" for Maroon 5 feat. Christina Aguilera
"Girl Panic!" for Duran Duran
"Mein Land" for Rammstein
2012
"Daylight" for Maroon 5
"Doom and Gloom" for The Rolling Stones
2013
"Haunted" for Beyoncé
"Superpower" for Beyoncé feat. Frank Ocean
2014
"Magic" for Coldplay
"Get Her Back" for Robin Thicke
"True Love" for Coldplay
"Dangerous" for David Guetta
2015
"Ghosttown" for Madonna
"Bitch I'm Madonna" for Madonna feat. Nicki Minaj
"RM486" for Rose McGowan feat. Punishment
"Could Have Been Me" for The Struts
2016
"New Romantics" for Taylor Swift
"Hold Up" for Beyoncé
"Óveður" for Sigur Rós
"Make America Great Again" for Pussy Riot
"ManUNkind" for Metallica
2017
"John Wayne" for Lady Gaga
"Praying" for Kesha
"The Way You Used to Do" for Queens of the Stone Age
"A Little Work" for Fergie
"You're the Best Thing About Me" for U2
2018
"Here Comes the Change" for Kesha
2019
"God Control" for Madonna
"Under the Graveyard" for Ozzy Osbourne

Filmography
Feature films
Spun (2002)
Horsemen (2009)
Small Apartments (2012)
Lords of Chaos (2018)
Polar (2019)
Midas Man (2022); replaced by Sara Sugarman

Concert and documentary films
Madonna: I'm Going to Tell You a Secret (2005)
Madonna: The Confessions Tour (2007) (won the 2008 Grammy Award for Best Long Form Music Video)
Paul McCartney: Live Kisses (2012) (won the 2014 Grammy Award for Best Music Film)
On the Run Tour: Beyoncé and Jay Z (2014)
Taylor Swift: The 1989 World Tour Live (2015)
Roxette: Roxette Diaries (2016)
Rammstein: Paris (2016)

Television
Clark (2022; TV series) (directed all 6 episodes)

Awards

2014 – Grammy – Best Music Film: Paul McCartney's "Live Kisses"
2011 – Echo Awards – Best National Video: Rammstein "Ich tu dir weh"
2010 – MVPA Awards – Best Collaboration: Lady Gaga feat Beyoncé "Telephone" 
2009 – MVPA Awards – Lady Gaga "Paparazzi"
2008 – MVPA Awards – James Blunt "Same Mistake"
2008 – Grammy – Best Long Form Music Video: Madonna NBC Special "The Confessions Tour"
2008 – Silver Addy – Dell "Work it Out"
2007 – MVPA Hall of Fame – Prodigy "Smack My Bitch Up"
2004 – MVPA Awards – Robbie Williams "Come Undone"
1999 – Grammy – Best Short Form Music Video: Madonna "Ray of Light"
1998 – MTV Video Music Award – Madonna "Ray of Light" (five awards: Video of the Year, Best Female Video, Best Director, Best Editing and Best Choreography - Jonas Åkerlund was also the editor and he and Madonna were the choreographers for this video)
1998 – MTV Video Music Award – Best Dance Video: The Prodigy "Smack My Bitch Up"

References

Further reading
 Henry Keazor, Thorsten Wübbena: Video Thrills The Radio Star. Musikvideos: Geschichte, Themen, Analysen. Bielefeld, Germany, 2005, p. 117ss., p. 146ss., p. 448

External links

Jonas Åkerlund at the MVDbase.com
CNN interview with Jonas Åkerlund
Jonas Åkerlund official web page
R.A.F. official web page

1965 births
Living people
Black metal musicians
Grammy Award winners
Musicians from Stockholm
Sommar (radio program) hosts
Swedish film directors
Swedish music video directors
Swedish heavy metal drummers
Television commercial directors